Sean Desmond Klaiber  (born 31 July 1994) is a professional footballer who plays as a right-back for Eredivisie club Utrecht and the Suriname national team. He formerly played for FC Dordrecht and Ajax, and represented his birth country of the Netherlands at youth international level.

Club career

Utrecht
Born in Nieuwegein, Klaiber played in the academies of VVIJ, Ajax, JSV Nieuwegein and SV Geinoord before joining the FC Utrecht youth academy in 2007. On 29 October 2013, Klaiber made his first appearance for the Utrecht first team in an official match. That day, the Domstedelingen played in Werkendam against Kozakken Boys in the KNVB Cup; a match which ended in a 1–2 away win after extra time in which Klaiber made an appearance as a 116th minute substitute for Kai Heerings. He made his debut in the Eredivisie some months later, on 23 February 2014, as a starter in a 1–0 win over FC Groningen.

During the second half of the 2014–15 season, Klaiber was loaned out to FC Dordrecht who also competed in the Eredivisie. He made 12 appearances for the side in which he scored two goals, as they suffered relegation.

In the 2016–17 season, after returning from Dordrecht, Klaiber made seven appearances for the reserves, Jong FC Utrecht. The following season, he grew out to become a regular starter for the first team. He scored his first goal for Utrecht on 20 July 2017 in a UEFA Europa League qualifier against Maltese side Valletta, which ended in a 3–1 win.

Ajax
On 1 October 2020, Klaiber signed a three-year contract with Ajax, with an optional additional year. The move reunited him with his former Utrecht coach Erik ten Hag, as he was set to replace Sergiño Dest at right back, after the latter had joined FC Barcelona some days earlier. On 18 October, he made his debut for Ajax as a substitute in the home match against sc Heerenveen. His first start for the club came on 24 October in a 0–13 win over VVV Venlo; an Eredivisie record. During the season, Klaiber was set to compete with Noussair Mazraoui for the right back position. On 27 October, Klaiber made his debut in the UEFA Champions League as a substitute during the away game against Italian club Atalanta.

Return to Utrecht
On 29 August 2022, Klaiber returned to Utrecht and signed a three-year contract.

International career
Born in the Netherlands, Klaiber is of Surinamese descent. Having played for the youth teams of the Netherlands, on 13 June 2021 it was announced that Klaiber had opted to represent Suriname internationally. On June 25 he was called up to represent the team at the 2021 CONCACAF Gold Cup.

On 12 July 2021, Klaiber made his debut in the group stage match against Jamaica. The match ended in a 2–0 loss, in Suriname's Gold Cup debut, which saw Klaiber being cautioned in the 25th minute.

Career statistics

Club

International

Honours
Ajax
 Eredivisie: 2020–21, 2021–22
 KNVB Cup: 2020–21

References

External links
 
 Netherlands profile at Ons Oranje

1994 births
Living people
People from Nieuwegein
Dutch footballers
Surinamese footballers
Dutch sportspeople of Surinamese descent
Association football defenders
FC Utrecht players
FC Dordrecht players
AFC Ajax players
Eredivisie players
Eerste Divisie players
2021 CONCACAF Gold Cup players
Netherlands youth international footballers
Netherlands under-21 international footballers
Suriname international footballers
Footballers from Utrecht (province)